Yanagushevo (Yanağoş) is a rural locality (a selo) in Uryadinsky Selsoviet, Mishkinsky District, Bashkortostan, Russia. The population was 410 as of 2010. There are 11 streets.

Geography 
Yanagushevo is located 25 km south of Mishkino (the district's administrative centre) by road. Novosafarovo is the nearest rural locality.

Famous natives 
 Gazi Zagitov

References 

Rural localities in Mishkinsky District